Newdigate is a village and civil parish in Surrey, England.

Newdigate or Newdegate may also refer to:

 Newdigate (surname), for people with that name (both spellings)
 Newdigate Prize, a prize for English verse awarded to University of Oxford students
 Newdigate baronets, a Baronetage of England
 Newdegate, Western Australia, a town
 Electoral division of Newdegate, an electoral division in the Tasmanian Legislative Council of Australia

See also
Newdigate-Reed House, near Maysville, Kentucky